Manhattan Special is a beverage company located in Brooklyn, New York. The company was founded in 1895 and is located in the neighborhood of Williamsburg. Their most famous product is their Espresso Coffee Soda, made with espresso beans, seltzer water, and sugar. The name of the company originated from the location of its plant on Manhattan Avenue.

Although best known for their coffee beverages, Manhattan Special also produces a line of more traditional sodas. It uses all natural flavors.  Flavors include vanilla cream soda, cherry, sarsaparilla, orange, and gassosa.

References

External links
 Official website

American companies established in 1895
American soft drinks
Drink companies of the United States
Cuisine of New York City
Drink brands
Coffee brands
Food and drink companies established in 1895
Food and drink companies based in New York City
1895 establishments in New York City